Gabriola is a display typeface designed by John Hudson for the Microsoft Corporation. It is named after Gabriola Island, British Columbia, Canada. Versions of Gabriola have been used in Windows 7, Windows 8 and Microsoft Office 2010.

Design
Gabriola was inspired by the calligraphy of Jan van de Velde the Elder. It was developed with advanced OpenType features and has been optimized for ClearType rendering to improve legibility on screens. Hudson added a number of stylistic alternate characters and flourishes, which were grouped thematically by stylistic set into different styles of calligraphy.

Distinguishing features
Easily identifiable and unusual features include:
 The flourish of the uppercase Q extends far below the following letter; e.g. Qualifier
 The flourish of the lowercase f and both the lowercase j and uppercase J extends far below the previous letter; e.g. alforja

References

External links
 The Importance of Gabriola by Larry Larsen

Microsoft typefaces
Typefaces and fonts introduced in 2008
Typefaces designed by John Hudson
Script typefaces